Andrew Dennis Biersack (born December 26, 1990), formerly known as Andy Six, is an American singer. He is the founder and lead vocalist of the rock band Black Veil Brides and is its only remaining original member. In 2014, he started a solo music project under the moniker Andy Black and released his debut album, The Shadow Side, in 2016.

Early life and education 
Biersack was born in Cincinnati, Ohio, to Chris and Amy Biersack.

For his early education, Biersack attended a Catholic elementary school, which he has spoken of in many interviews. His preschool teacher was Jamie Peters, who had a big influence on his creativity. Because of the way Biersack dressed and the music he listened to (i.e. Kiss, the Misfits, Avenged Sevenfold, the Damned, the Dropkick Murphys, etc.), he was the target of bullying at school. This bullying is reenacted in the "Knives and Pens" music video, performed by his band, Black Veil Brides.

For high school, Biersack attended Cincinnati's School for Creative and Performing Arts, and majored in drama and vocal music. Two days after he turned 18, he left school before graduating to move to Los Angeles in hopes of furthering his potential career.

Career

Black Veil Brides 

At age 14, Andy Biersack and a few of his friends formed their first band, called "Biersack" (although they only played one show). This project eventually grew into what would later be known as Black Veil Brides.

In September 2009 Black Veil Brides signed with the independent label StandBy Records. The writing process for a tour and a record began immediately. In 2009 they released their first music video for "Knives and Pens", which to date has garnered over 200 million views. The band embarked on their first US tour, titled "On Leather Wings". Their debut album, We Stitch These Wounds, was released July 20, 2010 and sold over 13,000 copies in its first week, ranking at No. 36 on the Billboard Top 200 chart and No. 1 on the Billboard Independent chart. The band's second studio album, Set the World on Fire, was released on June 14, 2011, through Lava Music/Universal Republic Records. The band's third album, Wretched and Divine: The Story of the Wild Ones, was released on January 8, 2013. Their fourth self-titled album was released on October 27, 2014. Their fifth album Vale was released January 12, 2018. In celebration of the 10th anniversary of their first album We Stitch These Wounds, a re-recording of the album titled Re-Stitch These Wounds was released on July 31, 2020, followed their sixth album The Phantom Tomorrow on October 29, 2021.

Andy Black 
In May 2014, Biersack revealed to Kerrang! magazine that he had been working on new music outside Black Veil Brides under the moniker 'Andy Black'. He explained that his solo project will have a radically different sound compared to the band, and that he felt he couldn't create that sound within the band, thus deciding to take it on as a solo artist. Andy's inspiration for this project was his love for '80s synth and goth music. He will be working with former Black Veil Brides producer John Feldmann. Despite this project, he reassured his fans that this does not mean this is his primary focus, but rather more of a hobby or a side-project. On May 19, 2014, he premiered his first song, titled "They Don't Need to Understand", online with a music video via Hot Topic.

On March 17, 2016, Biersack announced the title of his first Andy Black album The Shadow Side, scheduled to be released on May 6, 2016. The lead single from the project, "We Don't Have to Dance" was released on March 18, 2016, with a music video for the song being released on March 21.

On February 15, 2019, Biersack announced his second album, The Ghost of Ohio, which was released on April 12, 2019. The album's lead single Westwood Road was released the same day.

Other media 
After his move to Los Angeles, he took up acting for a short time. He had a small part in the AT&T commercial "Confetti", as well as a 30-second spot in the Montana Meth commercial "Jumped". Biersack guest stars in the Funny or Die web series Average Joe on YouTube. He also starred in the Black Veil Brides full-length feature film, Legion of the Black, which was released on January 6, 2013, to support the band's third album.

In February 2016, Biersack was cast to play the role of Johnny Faust in the independent supernatural thriller film American Satan alongside Asking Alexandria member Ben Bruce. The film, directed by Sumerian Records founder Ash Avildsen, was released on October 13, 2017.

Biersack authored the supernatural, historical fiction graphic novel Ghost of Ohio, in collaboration with Z2 Comics. The graphic novel was released on April 19, 2019, as a tie-in to the album The Ghost of Ohio.

Biersack wrote They Don't Need to Understand: Stories of Hope, Fear, Family, Life, and Never Giving In with longtime journalist Ryan J. Downey, which arrived in December 2020.

Personal life 

Biersack's stage name was "Andy Six" up until around 2011 when he decided that he preferred to be called by his birth name, Andy Biersack.

In an interview with Loudwire in 2012, Biersack said, "I'm not a religious person but I grew up in a religious family. I went to the funeral for my grandfather, a person that I love very much, and everyone is speaking about how he went to Heaven and how he's in Heaven. I always fight with that, because I would love nothing more to believe that my grandfather is in the clouds playing  or whatever awesome stuff they have up in Heaven, but I can't."

Biersack is a fan of comic books, he's listed comics such as Batman: Knightfall, V For Vendetta, Batman: Hush, and Kingdom Come as favorites.

On October 30, 2016, Biersack was involved in a physical altercation with his wife, Juliet Simms, on a flight back to Los Angeles. According to the video testimony given by adult film actress Mary Carey, a witness to the incident, Simms forcibly struck Biersack in the face twice. Carey also stated Simms struck herself in the face with the airline handcuffs until her nose began to bleed, alleging that she was defending herself against Biersack. In a video recorded by another passenger, Simms accused Biersack of breaking her ribs. Witnesses on the plane state Biersack did not lay a hand to Simms. Following the incident, both released statements about the effects of alcohol and confirming that they did not separate after the incident.

Stage injuries 
Biersack has suffered multiple injuries while performing with Black Veil Brides, most notably his fall from a  pillar on June 18, 2011, in Hollywood. In an attempt to jump back onto the stage, he fell forward and hit his ribcage, knees and skull on the edge, which resulted in three ribs shattered, and one displaced. That particular injury caused Black Veil Brides to have to miss the first week of the Vans Warped Tour in 2011. On October 26, 2011, while on another tour in the UK, Biersack broke his nose on the drum riser while performing a gig in Luxembourg, resulting in more missed tour dates. However, two days later, he performed with Black Veil Brides in London.

In an interview with Revolver Magazine in 2011, Biersack stated:

Discography

As Andy Black

Studio albums

Singles

As featured artist

Non-album tracks

Filmography

Film

Television

Music videos

With Black Veil Brides 

We Stitch These Wounds (2010)
Set the World on Fire (2011)
Wretched and Divine: The Story of the Wild Ones (2013)
Black Veil Brides (2014)
Vale (2018)
The Phantom Tomorrow (2021)

Accolades

References

External links 

 

1990 births
21st-century American male actors
Male actors from Cincinnati
21st-century American singers
American male singers
American rock singers
Glam metal musicians
Black Veil Brides members
Living people
Musicians from Cincinnati
American male web series actors
Singers from Ohio
American heavy metal musicians
Kerrang! Awards winners